Michael Davis is an American politician serving as a member of the Missouri House of Representatives from the 56th district. Elected in November 2020, Davis assumed office on January 6, 2021.

Early life and education 
Davis was raised in Maryland Heights, Missouri. He earned a Bachelor of Arts degree in education from Harris–Stowe State University in 2015 and a Juris Doctor from the Washburn University School of Law in 2018.

Career 
Davis began his career as an educator at an elementary school in the Blue Valley School District. Davis worked on campaigns for Jay Ashcroft, Adam Schnelting, and Bob Onder. He was also the an engagement director with Americans for Prosperity. Davis was elected to the Missouri House of Representatives in November 2020 and assumed office on January 6, 2021.

As of November 2022, Davis serves on the following committees:

 Crime Prevention
 Future of Right-of-Way Management and Taxation
 Judiciary
 Professional Registration and Licensing
 Special Committee on Criminal Justice

Electoral history

References 

Living people
People from St. Louis County, Missouri
Harris–Stowe State University alumni
Washburn University School of Law alumni
Republican Party members of the Missouri House of Representatives
Year of birth missing (living people)